Thomas Guybon (c. 1560 – 23 January 1605), of King's Lynn, Norfolk, was an English politician.

He was a Member (MP) of the Parliament of England for Castle Rising in 1597.

References

1560s births
1605 deaths
English MPs 1597–1598
People from King's Lynn